WISE (1310 AM) is a radio station broadcasting a sports format. Licensed to Asheville, North Carolina, United States, it serves the Asheville area.  The station is currently owned by the Asheville Radio Group of Saga Communications.

The station is an affiliate of the Atlanta Braves radio network, the largest radio affiliate network in Major League Baseball.

History
For many years, WISE was a Top 40 radio station. In the 1980s, the station switched to adult standards, with most of the music coming from Stardust, an ABC Radio satellite format.

Early in 2002, Asheville Radio Partners, part of American Media Services LLC in Charleston, South Carolina, bought WISE and WOXL-FM, along with the stations' building on Lookout Road. Hal Green was general manager, as well as WOXL's operations manager.

WISE gradually began adding talk shows in the early-2000s, eventually switching to talk radio full-time, and finally sports talk.

On December 3, 2015, Asheville Radio Group announced WISE would also air on 97.3 FM.

In 2018, WISE moved from W247BV 97.3 to W275CP 102.9. The 97.3 frequency, which remained the HD3 channel of WOXL-FM, switched to oldies.

According to the FCC database, the FM translator on 102.9 MHz relays WYSE.

References

External links
WISE official website

ISE
Fox Sports Radio stations
Radio stations established in 1939